The PMR-3 is a Yugoslavian anti-personnel stake mine. The mine is a development of the PMR-1 and PMR-2 stake mines, having a larger main charge and a greater effective radius. Two versions of the mine were built, an 'old' version and a 'new' version. The principal difference being that the 'old' model could be pressure and pull operated, while the 'new' model can only be pull operated.

The 'old' version consists of a cylindrical main body with six large fragmentation grooves running around the circumference and two mounting lugs on one side for mounting the mine to a provided metal stake. The 'new' version of the mine is similar, but with a smaller fuze and no fragmentation grooves.

The 'old' model of the mine is found in Bosnia, Chile, Croatia, and Kosovo. The 'new' model is found in Bosnia and Croatia.

Specifications

References
 Jane's Mines and Mine Clearance 2005-2006

Anti-personnel mines
Land mines of Yugoslavia